Mesbah 1 is an Iranian anti aircraft artillery system developed to defend against incoming cruise missiles. It was unveiled in 2010 by Iranian defense minister Ahmad Vahidi and hit its intended target successfully in the test. Production started some months later.

Design 
Mesbah uses 4 Iranian built Russian ZU-23-2 installed on a rotatable mount. Each autocannon has its own feed magazine. Each ZU-23-2 has a reported fire rate of 2000 rpm. But surprisingly the whole system is reported to have a rate of 4000 rpm instead of 8000. This is probably because developers wanted it to save ammunition. The mount can rotate in different angles but the exact degrees are unknown.

The system uses Radar and IR/Optical sensors to find its target automatically. Its radar is described as a 3D flat-antenna radar with a good accuracy that finds and traces the target and gives its position to the fire control system.

Mesbah is described being able to engage both fixed and rotary wing aircraft and cruise missiles in low and very low altitudes. Its automatic control system makes it need less crew to operate and its sophisticated tracking and tracing algorithms makes it able to engage small targets like incoming missiles.

Operators

See also
Equipment of the Iranian Army
Iranian military industry
Military of Iran

References

External links 
 Video of the system

Anti-aircraft guns
Weapons of Iran
Military equipment introduced in the 2010s